Strike Fighter Wing, U.S. Atlantic Fleet (SFWL) (aka Strike Fighter Wing Atlantic, SFWL, STRKFIGHTWINGLANT) is the U.S. Navy's largest type wing with 18 squadrons flying more than 300 aircraft composed of six different variants of the F/A-18 Hornet and Super Hornet. The wing, based at NAS Oceana, is also home to the east coast F/A-18 Fleet Replacement Squadron (FRS) which trains pilots and Weapon Systems Officers (WSOs) in the Hornet and Super Hornet before they are assigned to operational fleet squadrons. The fleet squadrons deploy as part of Carrier Air Wings (CVWs) on aircraft carriers on both the east and west coasts.

History
The wing was established in 1970 as Commander, Light Attack Wing One (CLAW ONE) at NAS Cecil Field, Florida.  With the introduction of the F/A-18 in the late 1980s, the command was redesignated as SFWL on 1 September 1993.  As a result of the Base Realignment and Closure Commission (BRAC) decision to close NAS Cecil Field in 1999, the wing relocated to NAS Oceana, Virginia in 1998.  In 2006, SFWL subsumed the staff of Commander, Fighter Wing Atlantic upon the retirement of the F-14 Tomcat and that wing's disestablishment.

Mission
Strike Fighter Wing's mission is to provide U.S. Atlantic Fleet commanders with combat-ready Strike Fighter squadrons which are fully trained, properly manned, well maintained and supported.  The wing is responsible for the readiness, training, administration, and maintenance support of all Atlantic Fleet F/A-18A-F Hornet and Super Hornet squadrons. Although this basic responsibility extends throughout the deployment cycle of individual units, direct operational control of fleet squadrons is generally retained by Carrier Air Wing commanders, whether deployed or not.  The Wing is also the lead advocate for issues, maintenance developments and operational readiness factors impacting the VFA community.

Organization
SFWL is commanded by a Navy captain, who is also known as the Wing "Commodore".  The wing staff consists of approximately 50 officer, enlisted and civilian personnel.   CSFWL reports directly to Commander, Naval Air Force U.S. Atlantic Fleet in Norfolk, Va.

Assigned units
Strike Fighter Wing Atlantic exercises administrative and operational command over one Fleet Replacement Squadron (VFA-106) and administrative command over 16 operational fleet F/A-18 squadrons.

Each Strike Fighter squadron normally consists of 10-12 aircraft, 22 officers and approximately 190 enlisted personnel.
VFA-11 Red Rippers
VFA-15 Valions
VFA-31 Tomcatters
VFA-32 Swordsmen
VFA-34 Blue Blasters
VFA-37 Bulls
VFA-81 Sunliners
VFA-83 Rampagers
VFA-87 Golden Warriors
VFA-103 Jolly Rogers
VFA-105 Gunslingers
VFA-106 Gladiators [FRS]
VFA-131 Wildcats
VFA-136 Knighthawks 
VFA-143 Pukin Dogs
VFA-211 Fighting Checkmates
VFA-213 Black Lions
Additionally, CSFWL exercises command over Strike Fighter Weapons School Atlantic.

See also
Naval aviation
Modern US Navy carrier air operations
List of United States Navy aircraft designations (pre-1962) / List of US Naval aircraft
United States Naval Aviator
List of United States Navy aircraft squadrons
List of Inactive United States Navy aircraft squadrons

References

External links
 Strike Fighter Wing, Atlantic

Air wings of the United States Navy
Fighter aircraft units and formations of the United States Navy
Military units and formations in Virginia